The Devil Plays the Flute (Spanish:El diablo toca la flauta) is a 1953 Spanish comedy film directed by José María Forqué and starring José Luis Ozores, Luis Prendes and Luis Arroyo.

Plot 
When the pieces of a singular figure are unearthed and then joined together, a devil of the lowest category breaks into a small Mediterranean village. From that moment on, the demon will enter the life of a painter named Bernardino, in the affairs of a "modern" marriage, in the existence of a frightened gardener and, finally, in the day-to-day life of the Great Momo.

Cast
 José Luis Ozores as Músico
 Luis Prendes as Bernaldino
 Luis Arroyo as Relojero
 Félix Dafauce as Momo
 Carmen Vázquez Vigo as Esposa
 Antonio Garisa as Marido
 Ricardo Acero as Pablo
 Irán Eory as Elisa
 José Prada as Jardinero
 Juan Vázquez as Delegado
 Antonio Ozores as Secretario
 Luis Orduña as Diablo jefe
 Xan das Bolas as Presidente
 Miguel Pastor as Europeo
 Adela Carboné as Laura
 José Ramón Giner as Conserje museo
 Manuel Requena as Alcalde
 José Luis López Vázquez as Periodista
 Delfina Jaufret
 Marcela Yurfa
 Trudy Losada
 José Villasante as Gobernante
 Amparo Gómez Ramos
 Ramón Navarro
 Emilio González de Hervás
 Emilio Gutiérrez
 Ángel Calero as Maître con secretario
 Pedro Tena
 Félix Briones as Miguelote, botones
 José Capilla
 Joaquín Bergía as Médico
 Juan Cazalilla as Peluquero
 Alfonso Rojas
 José María Rodríguez as Viejo hambriento
 José Marco
 Carlos Ciscar
 Manolo Morán as Don Cosme
 Miguel Gila as Burócrata

References

Bibliography 
 Bentley, Bernard. A Companion to Spanish Cinema. Boydell & Brewer 2008.

External links 
 

1953 comedy films
Spanish comedy films
1953 films
1950s Spanish-language films
Films directed by José María Forqué
Spanish black-and-white films
1950s Spanish films